This page lists the bishops of Masan.

The Roman Catholic Diocese of Masan was created in 1966 by Pope Paul VI. It is suffragan to Archdiocese of Taegu.

Bishops of Masan
Stephen Kim Sou-hwan (1966-1968)
Joseph Byung-hwa Jang (1968-1988)
Michael Jung-il Park (1988-2002)
Francis Xavier Myung-ok Ahn (2002-present)

 
Catholic Church in Korea